Oxynaspididae  is a family of goose barnacles in the order Lepadiformes.

Genera
The following genera are listed by the World Register of Marine Species:
Archoxnyaspis Van Syoc & Dekelboum, 2011 † 
Minyaspis Van Syoc & Dekelboum, 2011
Oxynaspis Darwin, 1852
Scleraspis Van Syoc & Dekelboum, 2012

References

Barnacles
Crustacean families